"Burnin' a Hole in My Heart" is a song co-written and recorded by American country music artist Skip Ewing.  It was released in November 1988 as the third single from the album The Coast of Colorado.  The song reached number 3 on the Billboard Hot Country Singles & Tracks chart.  Ewing wrote the song with Mike Geiger and Woody Mullis.

Chart performance

Year-end charts

References

1988 singles
1988 songs
Skip Ewing songs
Songs written by Skip Ewing
Song recordings produced by Jimmy Bowen
MCA Records singles
Songs written by Mike Geiger
Songs written by Woody Mullis